Parameshwara may refer to:

Parameshwara (god), a Sanskrit term for Supreme God
 Y. G. Parameshwara, first Indian and only the second person in the world to become a doctor and practice medicine despite being blind
Parameshvara Nambudiri, Indian mathematician
Parameswara (sultan), Malaccan sultan

G. Parameshwara, Indian Politician

Human name disambiguation pages